Life Changing is the third studio album by the contemporary gospel singer Smokie Norful. The album was released on October 3, 2006, through EMI Gospel.

Track listing
 "Celebrate" (Norful, Tyson) - 4:04
 "Um Good" (Bady) - 4:46
 "Great & Mighty" (Bady) - 4:15
 "Run Til I Finish" (Norful) - 3:07
 "In Time" (Norful, Tyson) - 4:14
 "More Than Anything" (Myron Butler, Norful) - 4:22
 "Where Would I Be?" (Norful) - 4:44
 "Put Your Hands Together" (Bell, Norful) - 3:46
 "Right Now" (White, Woods) - 4:57
 "Run to You" (Friedman, Rich) - 4:39
 "Celebrate (Reprise)"" (Norful, Tyson) - 1:01

Awards
At the 38th GMA Dove Awards, the album was nominated for a Dove Award for Contemporary Gospel Album of the Year.

Chart performances
In the USA, the album peaked at #56 on Billboard 200, #7 on Billboard's R&B/Hip-Hop Albums, #5 on Billboard's Christian Albums, and #2 on Billboard's Gospel Albums. It stayed for 68 weeks on the Gospel Albums charts and 30 weeks on the R&B/Hip-Hop charts. The songs "Celebrate" and "Um Good" peaked at #23 and #2 on Billboard's Gospel Songs chart.

References

External links
Life Changing in Amazon.com

2006 albums
Smokie Norful albums